Blashford is a small hamlet of approx. 65 dwellings situated close to  the New Forest National Park in Hampshire, England. It is in the civil parish of Ellingham, Harbridge and Ibsley.

In the late 1900s the area was subject to a series of gravel extractions and became a landscape of interconnecting open lakes and wet meadows. The area has recovered spectacularly since the days of gravel extraction and become a haven for all sorts of wildlife, including waterfowl, bats, otters and moths.

Blashford is home to the Blashford Lakes Nature Reserve. The  wildlife reserve is managed by the Wildlife Trust in partnership with the New Forest District Council and landowners Wessex Water and Bournemouth and West Hampshire Water. Blashford Lakes is an internationally important site for thousands of wildfowl. Its importance is recognised by its SSSI, Ramsar, SPA (Special Protection Area) and SINC  (Site of Importance for Nature Conservation) protection status. Several other parts of Blashford also have this status, including open lakes and the River Avon and associated flood plain. Linking these sites is an area of wetland known locally as Blashford Wet Meadows.

History

The Hales Family 
Blashford House (built 1600) was owned by the Hales family of Coventry, a younger branch of the Hales of Woodchurch. Sir John Hales, of Whitefriars Coventry and Blashford, (grandson of John Hales), was made a baronet in 1660. The 5th Baronet (also called John) lived in Blashford  and his obituary states he died in Blashford in 1802 after an unpleasant illness. He was succeeded in turn by his three sons, and the Baronetcy ended with the death of his youngest son Sir Christopher Hales (1785-1806).

Blashford House was then inherited by Rev. Dr Christopher Taylor (d 1822), descended from Sir Christopher Hales’ great aunt Elizabeth. He married Mary Lisle of Moyles Court, descended from Alice Lisle whose portrait hangs in the Houses of Parliament, and inherited the title of Lord of the Manor of Ellingham from his wife's family. A plaque to his memory is displayed in Ellingham Church, where also the grave of Alice Lisle can be found. The title of Lord of the Manor was sold by his son Edward Hayles Taylor to the Earl of Normanton, whose descendants hold the title today. (The property now called Blashford Manor has no historical connection with the Lord of the Manor, but has been renamed recently).

The Dylan Thomas Connection 
Although the Hales family may have been the most distinguished residents of Blashford, the most famous (or infamous) residents were the Macnamara family and their son-in-law, Dylan Thomas.

Francis Macnamara (1886-1946) was a poet and lived in New Inn House (now demolished) with his wife Yvonne, and his daughters Nicolette (Devas), Caitlan and Brigit. They enjoyed an unconventional Bohemian Lifestyle with Augustus John, who lived in nearby Fordingbridge, a regular visitor  Caitlan married Dylan Thomas who lived at Blashford in the early 1930s. During this time Francis moved out and Nora Summers, the photographer became a regular visitor. There are many photographs of the area in the book of Nora's photographs, particularly of Caitlan and the nearby River Avon. After Francis left, Nora became Yvonne Macnamara's lover

References

Villages in Hampshire